LORAN-C transmitter Malone was the master station of the Southeast U.S. LORAN-C Chain (GRI 7980) and the Whiskey Secondary of the Great Lakes chain (GRI 8970).  It used a transmission power of 800 kW for both chains.

Baudette LORAN-C transmitter was situated near Malone in Jackson County, Florida, United States.

The station was closed on February 8, 2010, as a budget cut.  The station, and all of the others, were considered to be obsolete with the general availability of GPS systems. The transmitter has been dismantled.

External links
 
 http://www.tech-service.net/loran/LORAN-1.XLS
 http://www.megapulse.com/chaininfo.html

Buildings and structures in Jackson County, Florida
Malone
Towers in Florida
2010 disestablishments in Florida